Malcolm-Jamaal Justin Subban (born December 21, 1993) is a Canadian professional ice hockey goaltender for the Rochester Americans of the American Hockey League (AHL) while under contract to the Buffalo Sabres of the National Hockey League (NHL). Subban was selected by the Boston Bruins in the first round (24th overall) of the 2012 NHL Entry Draft.  He played junior hockey in the Ontario Hockey League with the Belleville Bulls.

His older brother, P. K., is a now-retired Norris Trophy-winning defenceman. His younger brother, Jordan, is a former draft pick of the Vancouver Canucks.

Playing career

Junior
Subban made his Ontario Hockey League (OHL) debut with the Belleville Bulls during the 2009–10 season, appearing in a single game with the club.  The next season, Subban spent the entire season with the Bulls, appearing in 32 games and recording 10 wins.  Heading into the 2011–12 OHL season, Subban was a highly ranked prospect for the 2012 NHL Entry Draft, and finished the season as the number one ranked goaltender in North America.  The Boston Bruins made Subban the 24th overall pick of the 2012 draft.  He signed a three-year contract with the club just prior to the 2012–13 NHL lock-out. With the NHL shutdown, Subban returned to the Bulls for another season in the OHL, recording 29 wins in 46 games.

Boston Bruins
Subban attended his first NHL training camp with the Boston Bruins ahead of the 2013–14 season. He was cut shortly after appearing in a preseason game where he allowed 8 goals to the Detroit Red Wings, and assigned to Boston's American Hockey League affiliate in Providence. However, during the same preseason schedule, Malcolm had his first opportunity to face his defenceman brother P. K. Subban on the Habs squad on September 16, 2013, in a preseason match between the Bruins and Canadiens at Montreal's Bell Centre — Malcolm replaced Bruins rookie goaltender Chad Johnson at about 14 minutes into the game's second period, and managed to stop every shot in the 31:49 he played in-net, en route to a 6–3 defeat of the Canadiens.

During the 2014–15 Boston Bruins season, due to Boston's backup goaltender Niklas Svedberg needing conditioning with the team's AHL affiliate, Malcolm Subban received his first NHL call-up to back up Tuukka Rask on January 30, 2015.

On February 20, 2015, Subban made his NHL debut against the St. Louis Blues. He was replaced by Tuukka Rask in the second period after giving up 3 goals on 6 shots, but returned later in the game.

On February 6, 2016, he was hospitalized after taking a puck to the throat during pre-game warmups. The organization announced Subban would miss at least 8 weeks due to a fractured larynx.

After his injury healed during the 2016 off-season, Subban's play for the Providence Bruins during the 2016–17 AHL season resulted in an 11–14–1 record, with a 2.41 GAA and a .917 save percentage.  By the 2017 off-season, Subban, along with fellow Providence Bruins goaltender Zane McIntyre,  were each re-signed with the Boston Bruins for two years, at $650,000 per year.

Vegas Golden Knights
On October 3, 2017, Subban was claimed off waivers by the Vegas Golden Knights. He won his first NHL game on October 15, 2017, against his former team, the Boston Bruins. Subban started in place of the injured Marc-André Fleury.

On October 22, 2017, Subban was placed on injured reserve with a lower body injury. He had been injured the previous day in a game against the St. Louis Blues. On November 17, 2017 Subban was lifted off injured reserve and was the backup for Maxime Lagacé in the following game against the Los Angeles Kings. The first time Malcolm played a regular season game against his brother P. K. was on December 8, 2017, where Subban made a then career-high 41 saves to help the Knights beat the Predators 4–3. In doing so, the Subban brothers became the 10th set of brothers to play against one another with one a skater and another a goaltender. Subban was again placed on injured reserve, this time with an upper body injury, after being injured during practice on February 10, 2018. He recorded his first NHL shutout in a 5–0 victory against the Winnipeg Jets on March 21, 2019.

Chicago Blackhawks 
On February 24, 2020, Subban (alongside Slava Demin and a 2020 second-round pick) was traded to the Chicago Blackhawks in exchange for Robin Lehner and Martins Dzierkals in a three-team trade also involving the Toronto Maple Leafs. Subban made his first and only appearance for the Blackhawks in 2020 on March 3, where he replaced Corey Crawford for 70 seconds during a 6–2 victory over the Anaheim Ducks.

In the following off-season, due to salary cap considerations, Subban was not tendered a qualifying offer by Blackhawks on October 8. He returned to the Blackhawks however, signing at a lower cap hit on a two-year, $1.7 million contract on October 10. He made his first start for the Blackhawks during the team's opening game of the 2020–21 season. He allowed five goals on 33 shots against the Tampa Bay Lightning en-route to a 5–1 loss. On February 25, 2021, he recorded his first shutout as a member of the Blackhawks in a 2–0 win over the Columbus Blue Jackets.

With three goaltenders on the roster competing for ice time with the IceHogs, Subban featured in only 5 games, collecting 2 wins, through the opening two months of the season.

Buffalo Sabres
On December 2, 2021, Subban was traded by the Blackhawks to the Buffalo Sabres in exchange for future considerations. He made his debut with the Sabres, allowing six goals on 25 shots before he was pulled in the third period of a 6–2 defeat by the Carolina Hurricanes on December 4. On January 12, 2022, Subban made a relief appearance against the Tampa Bay Lightning in place of the injured Ukko-Pekka Luukkonen. Subban collided with Lightning forward Patrick Maroon late in the second period. He played out the remainder of the contest despite the collision. It was later revealed Subban suffered an upper-body injury. He underwent surgery, and Sabres' head coach Don Granato speculated Subban would miss the remainder of the season.  On April 29, 2022, during a Sabres home game against the Chicago Blackhawks, Subban sang "Star Spangled Banner" before the game.

International play

He was goaltender for Team Canada in the 2013 World Junior Championships in Ufa, Russia.  He appeared in six games, with four wins.  Canada finished in fourth place at the tournament.

Personal life
Subban's older brother P. K., won the Norris Trophy in 2013 and played for the Montreal Canadiens, Nashville Predators, & New Jersey Devils. His younger brother, Jordan, was selected in the fourth round by the Vancouver Canucks during the 2013 NHL Entry Draft and currently plays for the Dornbirn Bulldogs of the Austrian Hockey League (EBEL).  His father, Karl, is the fifth leading scorer in Lakehead University basketball history.  An older sister, Nastassia, played basketball at York University, ending her university career as the all-time leading scorer in Ontario University Athletics.

Career statistics

Regular season and playoffs

International

Awards
2010–11 – CHL Goaltender of the Week (week ending December 12)
2010–11 – OHL First All-Rookie Team
2011–12 – CHL Goaltender of the Week (week ending November 6)
2011–12 – CHL Goaltender of the Week (week ending November 27)
2012–13 – CHL Goaltender of the Week (week ending February 24)
2012–13 – CHL Goaltender of the Week (week ending April 14)
2012–13 – OHL Third All-Star Team

References

External links
 
Malcolm Subban (Draft Prospect Card) at NHL.com

1993 births
Living people
Belleville Bulls players
Black Canadian ice hockey players
Boston Bruins draft picks
Boston Bruins players
Buffalo Sabres players
Canadian ice hockey goaltenders
Canadian people of Jamaican descent
Canadian people of Montserratian descent
Chicago Blackhawks players
National Hockey League first-round draft picks
People from York, Toronto
Providence Bruins players
Rockford IceHogs (AHL) players
Ice hockey people from Toronto
Vegas Golden Knights players